William Harjo LoneFight (born 1966), is president and CEO of American Native Services, a consulting firm in Bismarck, North Dakota.

An alumnus of Dartmouth College, Oklahoma City University, and Stanford University, LoneFight has served on the board of directors of the American Indian College Fund, American Indian Higher Education Consortium, and The Jacobson Foundation. An enrolled citizen of the Muscogee (Creek) Nation of Oklahoma with Natchez ancestry, Harjo was raised in a traditional Muscogee (Creek) Indian community.  LoneFight wrote a book, Achieving the Healing Community: A Guide to Traditional Knowledge of Substance Abuse Prevention (1999), to help social workers develop new approaches to substance abuse prevention. He is an accomplished creative writer and was anthologized in the milestone anthology, "Returning the Gift," a collection of Native American poets. He also developed a culturally-based pedagogical theory which seeks to reform approaches in the disciplines of math, science, and technology to utilize the diverse cultural backgrounds of such students in order to enhance their learning.

Selected boards and service
American Indian Higher Education Consortium, board of directors, 2002–2006. Chair, Federal Relations Committee 2003–2006
North Dakota Association of Tribal Colleges, board of directors, 2002–2005
Sisseton Wahpeton College. President, 2003
American Indian College Fund, board of directors, 2004–2006
Sisseton, South Dakota Chamber of Commerce 2003-2005
Coalition for the Advancement of Mathematics and Science Education in Oklahoma (CASMEO) Board of directors and executive committee
Oklahoma State Interagency Task Force on the Prevention of Child Abuse 1994
Dartmouth College Alumni Council, 1999
Jacobson Foundation, Norman, OK, board of directors

Name
"Lone Fight" is a broad family name related exclusively to the Mandan, Hidatsa and Arikara Nation of the Fort Berthold Reservation in North Dakota. The original spelling of "Lone Fight" consists of two words, but the spelling "LoneFight" is becoming more common. "Harjo" is a Muscogee surname.

Notes

External links
American Indian College Fund
Tribal Colleges Develop Economy

1966 births
Living people
Dartmouth College alumni
Oklahoma City University alumni
Stanford University alumni
Native American writers
People from Bismarck, North Dakota
Natchez people
Muscogee (Creek) Nation people
Writers from North Dakota
20th-century Native Americans
21st-century Native Americans